The 2018–19 Minnesota Golden Gophers women's basketball team represented the University of Minnesota during the 2018–19 NCAA Division I women's basketball season. The Golden Gophers, led by first-year head coach Lindsay Whalen, played their home games at Williams Arena as members of the Big Ten Conference. They finished the season 21–11, 9–9 in Big Ten play to finish in a 4-way tie for fifth place. They lost in the second round of the Big Ten women's tournament to Indiana. They received at-large bid of the WNIT. There they defeated Northern Iowa in the first round before losing to Cincinnati in the second round.

Roster

Schedule and results

|-
! colspan=9 style=| Non-conference regular season

|-
! colspan=9 style=|Big Ten conference season

|-
! colspan=9 style=|Big Ten Women's Tournament

|-
! colspan=9 style=|WNIT

Source

Rankings

^Coaches did not release a Week 2 poll.

See also
2018–19 Minnesota Golden Gophers men's basketball team

References

Minnesota Golden Gophers women's basketball seasons
Minnesota
Minnesota Golden Gophers women's basketball team
Minnesota Golden Gophers women's basketball team
Minnesota